Jack Carter may refer to:

 Jack Carter (actor) (died 1967), American actor in the early twentieth century
 Jack Carter (comedian) (1922–2015), American comedian, actor, and host
 Jack Carter (cricketer) (1907–1995), Australian cricketer
 Jack Carter (Eureka character), character on the American science fiction drama Eureka
 Jack Carter (footballer) (1910–1992), English professional footballer
 Jack Carter (politician) (born 1947), American businessman and politician
 Jack Carter, the protagonist of several novels by Ted Lewis, and of the film adaptations of those novels

See also
 John Carter (disambiguation)
 Jack Carter's Law, a 1974 novel by Ted Lewis
 Jack Cater (1922–2006), Chief Secretary of Hong Kong